De Haar is a hamlet in the Netherlands and is part of the Assen municipality in Drenthe. The TT Circuit Assen is located in the hamlet.

De Haar is not a statistical entity, and the postal authorities have placed it in Assen. It was first mentioned in the 1850s and means "sandy ridge".

Most of the farms have been torn down for the military training ground De Haar.

References 

Populated places in Drenthe
Assen